R. terrae may refer to:

 Roseateles terrae, a species of Gram negative bacteria
 Roseomonas terrae, a species of Gram negative bacteria